Leonid Mitrofanovich Zamyatin (9 March 1922 – 19 June 2019) was a Soviet ambassador and diplomat.

Biography 
He graduated from the Moscow Aviation Institute, and worked as a diplomat from 1946. He became an adviser to the Soviet delegation at the United Nations, and a permanent representative of the Soviet Union on the IAEA Board of Governors. From 1962 to 1970, he served in the Ministry of Foreign Affairs of the Soviet Union, becoming head of the press department. From 1970 to 1978, he was director general of TASS, the official news agency of the Soviet Union. He was Chairman of the International Information Department of the Central Committee of the Communist Party of the Soviet Union from 1978 to 1986. In 1986, he was appointed the Soviet ambassador to the United Kingdom. He was forced to resign his ambassadorship after his refusal to condemn the 1991 August coup against Mikhail Gorbachev.

References

External links
 Сайт посольства РФ в Великобритании

1922 births
2019 deaths
People from Kurganinsky District
Ambassadors of the Soviet Union to the United Kingdom
Central Committee of the Communist Party of the Soviet Union members
Diplomatic Academy of the Ministry of Foreign Affairs of the Russian Federation alumni
Eighth convocation members of the Supreme Soviet of the Soviet Union
Ninth convocation members of the Supreme Soviet of the Soviet Union
Tenth convocation members of the Supreme Soviet of the Soviet Union
Eleventh convocation members of the Soviet of Nationalities
International Atomic Energy Agency officials
Moscow Aviation Institute alumni
Lenin Prize winners
Recipients of the Order of Friendship of Peoples
Recipients of the Order of Lenin
Recipients of the Order of the Red Banner of Labour
Cold War diplomats